Matthew Rahn (born January 14, 1982) is a retired American football player and since 2020, the acting head coach of the College of DuPage Chaparrals football team.

College career
Rahn attended the College of DuPage, where he was a member of the football team. His play earned him a scholarship to Hastings College in Nebraska.

Professional career

Chicago Slaughter
In 2007, Rahn began playing professionally for the Chicago Slaughter of the Continental Indoor Football League.  The Slaughter was in its inaugural season led by ex-Chicago Bears player, Steve McMichael. Rahn played nose tackle.

Milwaukee Boncrushers
In 2008, Rahn played for the Milwaukee Bonecrushers of the CIFL, where he was moved to primarily Guard and Tight end, as well as reserve defensive lineman.

Rock River Raptors
In 2009, Rahn played for the Rock River Raptors of the Continental Indoor Football League.

Chicago Cardinals
In 2010, Rahn played for the Chicago Cardinals also of the CIFL.

Wisconsin Wolfpack
Because of financial reasons, Rahn opted out of his contract with the Cardinals to find a better opportunity. He signed with the Wisconsin Wolfpack, who would eventually play in the 2010 CIFL Championship Game, where they lost to the Cincinnati Commandos 54–40. He was named a 1st Team All-CIFL lineman at the end of the season.

Cuiabá Arsenal
In 2010, Rahn signed with the Cuiabá Arsenal in Brazil. They won the 2010 national championship, and finished second in 2011.

Northern Kentucky River Monsters
In 2011, Rahn signed with the Northern Kentucky River Monsters of the Ultimate Indoor Football League. He was named 1st Team All-UIFL Offensive Lineman, while helping his team to an 11-3 regular season record.

Cleveland Gladiators
Rahn signed with the Cleveland Gladiators of the Arena Football League for the 2012 season.

Omaha Beef
Rahn signed with the Omaha Beef in the middle of the 2012 season.  He then played the 2013 and 2014 seasons with them also.

Sioux City Bandits
Rahn played the 2015 and 2016 season with the Sioux City Bandits of Champions Indoor Football. On February 22, 2017, in late February Rahn was talked out of retirement and re-signed for the 2017 season.  Rahn signed back with the Sioux City Bandits for the 2018 season, as the oldest player in the league helped his team to the Championship game while earning First Team CIF North honors.

Coaching
Since 2020, Matt has been the acting head coach of the College of DuPage Chaparrals football team.

References

1982 births
Living people
Sportspeople from Wheaton, Illinois
Players of American football from Illinois
Cleveland Gladiators players
Northern Kentucky River Monsters players
Chicago Cardinals (CIFL) players
Chicago Slaughter players
Wisconsin Wolfpack players
Chicago Blitz (indoor football) players
Omaha Beef players
Sioux City Bandits players
College of DuPage Chaparrals football players